The 44th Canadian Parliament is the session of the Parliament of Canada which began on 22 November 2021, with the membership of the House of Commons, having been determined by the results of the 2021 federal election held on 20 September. Parliament officially resumed on 22 November with the re-election of Speaker Anthony Rota, and the Speech from the Throne read by Governor General Mary Simon the following day.

It is led by a Liberal Party minority government under the premiership of Justin Trudeau. Six months into the first session on 22 March 2022 it was announced that the New Democratic Party would henceforth support the government with confidence and supply measures.

Current Leadership of the House of Commons

Presiding Officer

Liberal Leadership (Government)

Conservative Leadership (Opposition)

Timeline

2021
20 September – In the 44th Canadian federal election, the incumbent Liberal Party wins the most seats in the House of Commons, but fails to reach a majority government.
26 October – The new Ministry is sworn in, the first overseen by Governor General Mary Simon.
22 November – Opening of the 44th Parliament, and election of the Honourable Anthony Rota as Speaker of the House of Commons.

2022 
 2 February – Erin O'Toole is removed as the leader of the Conservative Party, and consequently as the Leader of the Official Opposition, in a caucus vote.
 21 February – The House of Commons votes to confirm the Emergencies Act, with 185 for and 151 opposing the motion. The act was invoked in relation to the convoy protests in Ottawa and at border points.
 23 February – The equivalent Emergencies Act confirmation motion in the Senate is withdrawn without a vote by Representative of the Government in the Senate, Marc Gold, following the revocation of the Emergencies Act by the government earlier that day.
 22 March – The Liberal Party and New Democratic Party announce a confidence-and-supply agreement that will see the NDP support the Liberals on confidence motions (including budgets) until 2025 in exchange for Liberal support of certain NDP policies.
 28 May – Liberal Sven Spengemann resigns as the MP for Mississauga—Lakeshore to accept a role in the United Nations.
 10 September – The 2022 Conservative Party leadership election concludes. Pierre Poilievre is elected as the new Conservative leader.
 13 September – Alain Rayes, Member of Parliament for Richmond—Arthabaska, leaves the Conservative caucus to sit as an Independent, following the election of Pierre Poilievre as Conservative leader.
 19 November – The 2022 Green Party leadership election concludes. Elizabeth May is announced as the new leader of the Green Party of Canada.
 12 December – A federal by-election is held in Mississauga–Lakeshore, electing Liberal Charles Sousa.
 12 December – Liberal MP for Winnipeg South Centre Jim Carr died due to cancer.
 31 December – Bob Benzen resigns as the Member of Parliament for Calgary Heritage.

2023
 27 January  – Dave MacKenzie resigns as the Member of Parliament for Oxford.
 1 February – Candice Bergen resigns as the Member of Parliament for Portage—Lisgar.
 8 March – Marc Garneau resigns as the Member of Parliament for Notre-Dame-de-Grâce—Westmount.

Standings

See also 
Women in the 44th Canadian Parliament
Official Opposition Shadow Cabinet of the 44th Parliament of Canada

External links 
 Members of 44th Parliament at Parliament of Canada

References 

 
2021 establishments in Canada
Justin Trudeau
Minority governments